Clarence Cullam Pope (October 26, 1929 – January 8, 2012) was the second bishop of the Episcopal Diocese of Fort Worth and a prominent leader in traditionalist Anglicanism in North America.

Early life and career
Pope was born in Lafayette, Louisiana. He was educated at Centenary College (B.A. 1950) and the University of the South (B.D. 1954). He was ordained deacon on June 29, 1954, and priest on May 9, 1955.

After serving parishes in Louisiana, Pope was consecrated Bishop Coadjutor of Fort Worth on January 5, 1985; he became diocesan bishop on January 1, 1986. He was president of the Episcopal Synod of America, now Forward in Faith, from 1989 to 1993.

Pope retired as diocesan bishop on December 31, 1994, and was received into the Roman Catholic Church by Cardinal Bernard Law on February 1, 1995. He subsequently returned to the Episcopal Church, but was again received into the Roman Catholic Church in 2007.

References

External links
Obituary by George Conger

1929 births
2012 deaths
American Roman Catholics
20th-century Anglican bishops in the United States
Anglo-Catholic bishops
Anglican bishop converts to Roman Catholicism
American Anglo-Catholics
Centenary College of Louisiana alumni
People from Lafayette, Louisiana
Episcopal bishops of Fort Worth